Zdenko Miletić (born 23 April 1968 in Sarajevo) is a Croatian former professional footballer who played as a goalkeeper, primarily in the German leagues.

He works as goalkeeper coach for FC Augsburg.

References

External links
 

1968 births
Living people
Sportspeople from Sarajevo
Association football goalkeepers
Yugoslav footballers
Croatian footballers
NK Zagreb players
NK Maribor players
SC Preußen Münster players
SC Verl players
Arminia Bielefeld players
FC Augsburg players
Yugoslav Second League players
Regionalliga players
Bundesliga players
2. Bundesliga players
Croatian expatriate footballers
Expatriate footballers in Germany
Croatian expatriate sportspeople in Germany